Groveland is a town in Essex County, Massachusetts, United States. It is thirty-four miles north of Boston. At the 2020 census, it had a population of 6,752. The town is divided into two precincts, Groveland and South Groveland.

History
Groveland was originally the East Parish of Bradford, which was originally part of the town of Rowley. Before Bradford was separated from Rowley in 1672, it was called "Rowley on the Merrimack", or just "Merrimack". Bradford in turn was annexed by Haverhill in 1897. Groveland officially incorporated as a separate town on September 9, 1850. Groveland residents celebrate the anniversary of this date as Groveland Day.

In December 1638, after seventeen years of service, the Reverend Ezekiel Rogers was discharged from his post as rector of the parish of Rowley in Yorkshire, England. He had refused to read "that accursed book allowing sports on the Lord's Day." Believing the future of Puritanism was at stake, he and the members of twenty families sailed for the New World. Within these families were people of means and learning, including farmers, weavers, carpenters, and smiths. They landed at Salem, Massachusetts, but did not attempt to make a settlement until the following spring. The first printing press brought to America was on board that same ship, the "John of London".

Since there were no plantations left along the coastline, Reverend Rogers settled a tract of land between Ipswich and Newbury, where a land boom had developed. These two towns had already established grants on this tract, so the newcomers were required to purchase them for £800. Reverend Rogers's settlement was established in modern-day Rowley. Named Roger's Plantation and later Rowley after the English town, the initial settlement comprised sixty families. In September 1639, the town incorporated, and included the territory now occupied by Rowley, Georgetown, Groveland, Boxford, and Bradford.

The Congregational church in Groveland has a bell crafted by Paul Revere.  Of the 900 bells made by Revere's company, this is one of two remaining bells in active service (the other is in Lowell, Massachusetts). In town hall, the oldest hand-pump fire-engine in the country is on display. Built in 1798 and originally named Torrent of Roxbury, Massachusetts, the hand pumper was moved to Bradford in 1828 and renamed Engine 2. In 1850, the same year East Bradford became Groveland, the pumper was renamed Veto.

Downtown Groveland

Groveland's downtown is framed by the gazebo in Elm Park. Elm Park is a recent addition to Groveland. In the early part of the last century, elm trees were dominant in the landscape. Then, about 1950, many of the trees died of Dutch elm disease. It is only recently that resistant varieties of elms have been developed. With this development, the townspeople built a new park, planted with the new resistant variety. Since Groveland is primarily a bedroom community, there is considerable traffic during the commute drive time. However, once the rush is over, the town reverts to a sleepy village, with children and some grownups riding their bicycles about and walking.

Named Constitution Park when first created in 1832, it was only in 1857 that the elm trees arrived and with it the park's new name. Elm Park was the first planned housing development in the area. House lots were laid out around the common and the owners of which given rights to the well at the south end of the common. By the 1950s, Dutch elm disease had ravaged most of the trees. In the early 1960s, the last tree was taken down and the park's fountain dismantled. Thirty years later, thanks to the perseverance of Groveland residents and town officials, the town received the first of several state grants to restore Elm Park. With assistance from the Department of Environmental Management, the Historic Commission and others, Groveland has succeeded in restoring Elm Park to its historic charm.

Today visitors can walk along new sidewalks lit at night by new versions of the park's original lampposts. A new fountain resembling the original, a gazebo much like the old Methodist meeting house that sat at the south end of the park, and a new clock adorn the grounds. A large stone sign and monuments to local veterans depict some of the park and town's history. The new elm trees are planted in roughly the same pattern as the originals.

The first town post office was established in 1810 in Bradford, and was located in Squire Greenough's store on Main Street. Mr. Greenough was the postmaster until 1825, when he was succeeded by Capt. Benjamin Parker, who relocated the post office, at first, to his own store, and then to the blacksmith shop near the Haverhill Bridge. Later that same year, the building itself was moved to the other side of the street, where it remained for many years. After the town of Groveland was established in 1850, a new post office was built approximately half a mile from the present location on Main Street.

Geography and transportation
The town lies along the south banks of the Merrimack River, and several other brooks, as well as the Parker River, pass through the town. There are two ponds, Crane Pond in the eastern end of town, and Johnson's Pond, on the Boxford town line. Along with a town forest, much of the eastern corner of town is taken up by the Crane Pond Wildlife Management Area.

Groveland is located in the northwestern part of Essex County, and is bordered by Haverhill to the west and northwest, West Newbury to the northeast, a small portion of Newbury to the east, Georgetown to the southeast, and Boxford to the southwest.

There are no interstates passing through Groveland, the town lying between Interstate 95 and Interstate 495. Route 97 and Route 113 both enter the town over the Bates Bridge, a truss bridge built in 1913 carrying the roads into town from Haverhill. Note: The bridge is now closed as of September 19, 2013 and replaced by a new span (also named the Congressman Bates Bridge) immediately to the East of the old bridge. From the end of the bridge, Route 97 heads south through the town to Georgetown, while Route 113 bears eastward along the river towards West Newbury. The project is expected to take two to three years and cost approximately $45 million.

The Merrimack Valley Regional Transit Authority operates a route through town; there is no other mass transit within town.  The Haverhill/Reading Line of the MBTA Commuter Rail terminates in neighboring Haverhill, providing rail service into Boston's North Station.  The nearest small-craft airport is Lawrence Municipal Airport in North Andover, and the nearest national air service can be found at Logan International Airport. There is a Peter Pan bus that goes to North Station that picks up/drops off at The Tea Garden, the Chinese food restaurant and bar in town.

Climate

Demographics

As of the census of 2010, there were 6,459 people, 2346 households, and 1 families{error?} residing in the town. The racial makeup of the town was 97.38% White, 0.48% African American, 0.08% Native American, 0.91% Asian, 0.26% from other races, and 0.85% from two or more races. Hispanic or Latino of any race was 1.32% of the population.

There were 2346 households, of which 34.3% had children under the age of 18 living with them, 65.2% were married couples living together, 8.6% had a female householder with no husband present, and 22.8% were non-families. 18.5% of all households were made up of individuals, and 10.7% had someone living alone who was 65 years of age or older. The average household size was 2.75 and the average family size was 3.15.

In the town, the population was spread out, with 24.7% under the age of 18, 6.9% from 18 to 24, 21.3% from 25 to 44, 32.1% from 45 to 64, and 15.1% who were 65 years of age or older. The median age was 43.5 years. For every 100 females, there were 93.8 males. For every 100 females age 18 and over, there were 90.4 males.

The median income for a household in the town was $84,232, and the median income for a family was $95,451. Males had a median income of $61,750 versus $54,023 for females. The per capita income for the town was $34,254; about 3.6% of families and 4.0% of the population were below the poverty line, including 8.2% of those under age 18 and 2.6% of those age 65 or over.

Government

Groveland has an open-town meeting form of government. The Board of Selectmen comprises five members who are elected for three-year terms, in the annual town election. The Selectmen are vested with all the municipal authority not specifically retained by the town's legislative body, town meeting, or other elected boards. The Selectmen are responsible for all facets of governmental duties. The warrants for the annual and special town meetings are generated from their office, as are any warrants for any elections or override votes scheduled. The Selectmen work together with the Finance Director, the Town Accountant, and Finance Committee members, to establish the annual operating budget for the town. Every July 1 the Selectmen appoint residents to various official boards and commissions, approve the hiring of all employees, hold public hearings on important town issues, and enforce town by-laws and regulations. The Board of Selectmen meets bi-weekly on Monday evenings, unless otherwise posted, at 6:30  in the main meeting room of Town Hall. Most all of the meetings on important town issues in which the public are expected to participate are held after normal "working hours." This allows the working public to participate fully in the government of the town.

Groveland Town Hall
The town's administrative complex is located on Main Street, and contains the town hall, police and fire stations, and the Langley-Adams Library. Located at 183 Main Street, the Groveland Town Hall contains most of Groveland's municipal offices. The large windows in front expose a showroom containing historic artifacts, including the famous "VETO No. 2" fire pumper, Groveland's first fire apparatus.

Groveland Police Department

Because of the low crime rate, there is not a lot of visible activity here. However, the police are on duty 24/7 and a dispatcher is always on site. This facility also contains a jail for temporary holding of suspects.

Groveland Fire Department

The Fire Department consists of 40 firefighters all of which serve on a paid call basis. There are two stations from which the firefighters are dispatched, Central Station (as seen in the picture on the left) and South Station. The workforce is divided equally between the 2 stations 20 firefighters in Central Station and 20 in South Station. The Fire Department serves the town in all areas of fire suppression including residential, commercial, and woodland properties. Currently the GFD has 8 in service apparatuses. In Central Station there is the Ladder Truck, Engine 1(pumper) Squad 1 and Tanker 1. In South Station you can find Squad 2, Engine 2 (Tanker/Pumper), Engine 3 (pumper) and Combo 2 (forestry truck). It is also responsible for conducting water and ice rescue in addition to providing numerous emergency medical service calls. Fire personnel undergo rigorous and diversified training on an ongoing basis in order to develop the skills necessary to provide the services needed in a rapidly growing community. The department's equipment and manpower is designed to be flexible, efficient, effective, and tailored to addressing the specific community needs.

Langley-Adams Library

Langley-Adams Library is a public library and a member of the Merrimack Valley Library Consortium, sharing book-borrowing with other area libraries. The Library uses the Evergreen open source integrated library system that is common to all libraries in the Consortium.

Education

Groveland is a member of the Pentucket Regional School District, which includes the towns of West Newbury and Merrimac. Groveland itself currently has one educational institution, the Dr. Elmer S. Bagnall Elementary School. Junior and senior high school students attend Pentucket Regional Middle School and Pentucket Regional High School, respectively, which are located in West Newbury (the middle school straddles the town line between Groveland and West Newbury).  The Dr. Elmer S. Bagnall Elementary School is also home to the Groveland Summer Recreation Program, a very popular non-profit summer day camp run by the Town of Groveland.  Approximately 250 children between the ages of 6–15 attend this seven-week recreation camp.  The program runs from the last week in June to the second week in August each year.  The program wrapped up its ninth season on August 12, 2011.  2012 will mark its tenth year in operation, and the program's eighth year under its current director.  In 2011, the program introduced an extended day option until 5:30pm, aimed to reduce the burden on working parents during the summer months.

Places of worship
Groveland Congregational Church, 4 King Street
St James Episcopal Church, 121 Washington Street
New Destiny Christian Church, 2 Esty Way
St Patrick's Parish, 114 Center Street (part of Sacred Hearts Parish of Bradford)

Points of interest

The town supports baseball and soccer fields, basketball courts, picnic areas and parks, as well as boating facilities on the Merrimack River. In 2005, Groveland built Elm Park near its center, replacing a basketball court. The town also built a new basketball court half a mile away in the town's recreation area, the Pines.  North Groveland is also home to attractions such as Stickney's Boulder and Cedardale. South Groveland contains notable attractions such as Washington Park, Nuns' Hill, Steve's Corner, and the Fertile Crescent.  The town's sand pits, long a spot for automobile arson and adolescent hi-jinks, are soon to be converted into a mixed-income condominium complex.

The Pines Recreation Area

The Pines Recreation area comprises two basketball courts, two baseball diamonds, and facilities for cookouts, bonfires, fireworks observation, plus access to the Merrimack River. A skateboard area also exists, but is not as popular as in the past. The Pines also provides a nature trail that runs through a wooded area along the river. Motor vehicles have been excluded from this trail so it is a quiet place to walk or jog. In addition to the sports facilities, the Pines Recreation area also provides swings and similar playground equipment for the youngest family members who might not yet be old enough to enjoy the sports facilities.

Notable people

 John G. B. Adams, American soldier who received the Medal of Honor for his actions during the American Civil War
 Pat Badger, bassist for the Boston band Extreme
 Larry Dorr, lifelong resident. Manager of Blood Sweat & Tears for 26 years, as well as many other musicians

References

An Outline of Groveland History
Groveland info from the Commonwealth of Massachusetts
Early history of Groveland
2005 FBI crime statistics for Groveland
Kingsbury, J D. Memorial History of Bradford. published in 1883 by  C C Morse and Son.
Cogswell, John. History of Bradford. from the History of Essex County vol.2 published by Hurd in 1888.
Perry, Gardiner . Discourse on the History of Bradford. published in 1821.
Topsfield Historical Society (1907), Vital Records of Bradford, Massachusetts to the Year 1849 at books.google.
Kimball, Daniel and Daniel Stickney and Nathaniel Thurston. Map of Bradford 1795 .
Jeremiah Spofford and Benjamin Greenleaf.  Map of Bradford 1831 . click on the map to get a very large image.
 D.G.Beers, 1872 Atlas of Essex County. Map of Groveland. Shows the Railway line.

External links

Town of Groveland official website
Groveland Summer Recreation Program
Groveland Public Library
Groveland Historical Society
 Groveland Map of 1884 Atlas of Essex County
Cedardale
Extracts from the Old Parish and Church Records of the Congregational Church in Groveland (1800s)
City guide from masscities.com

 
Massachusetts populated places on the Merrimack River